Britt Airways was a United States airline established as Vercoa Air Service in 1964 and renamed to Britt Airlines when it was purchased by William and Marilyn Britt in 1975 later on Britt Airways. It was based in Terre Haute, Indiana until 1996 . It began as a  commuter airline. It primarily operated turboprop aircraft but also flew British Aircraft Corporation BAC One-Eleven twinjets as an independent air carrier at one point as well.  The airline evolved into a regional air carrier operating code share flights primarily for Continental Airlines.

History

In 1971 Britt Airways purchased a small fleet of Beechcraft 99 light turboprop airliners and by late 1975 these were operated under contract as Allegheny Commuter flights on behalf of Allegheny Airlines.  According to the October 29, 1978 Britt Airways system timetable, commuter flights for Allegheny were operated by Britt from the airline's small hub located at Chicago O'Hare Airport (ORD) with service to Bloomington, IN, Danville, IL, Indianapolis, IN, Muncie, IN and Terre Haute, IN.  In 1979, Britt was continuing to serve these aforementioned destinations as an Allegheny Commuter air carrier from Chicago and was also flying independently operated service to Bloomington, IL/Normal, IL, Champaign, IL/Urbana, IL, Evansville, IN, Galesburg, IL, Indianapolis, IN, Moline, IL, Peoria, IL, St. Louis, MO, Springfield, IL and Sterling, IL/Rock Falls, IL with flights primarily operated from Chicago O'Hare as well as an Indianapolis-Evansville-St. Louis route and an Indianapolis-Champaign/Urbana route.  All Allegheny Commuter as well as independently operated services were being flown with Beechcraft 99 and Swearingen Metroliner (Metro II model) turboprops at this time.  By 1980, the airline had expanded its hub operation at Chicago O'Hare with new service to Decatur, IL, Mattoon, IL/Charleston, IL, and South Bend, IN, and had also expanded its fleet with the addition of larger Fairchild Hiller FH-227 turboprops.

In 1981, Britt began operating as an independent air carrier from a major hub located at Chicago O'Hare Airport (ORD) and also from smaller hubs located at St. Louis Lambert International Airport (STL) and Indianapolis International Airport (IND).  By early 1985, the airline was operating jet service as an independent air carrier with British Aircraft Corporation BAC One-Eleven twin jets and was also continuing to fly Beechcraft 99, Fairchild Hiller FH-227 and Swearingen Metroliner (Metro II model) turboprops.

In 1985, the founder and owner of Britt Airways, Bill Britt, sold the airline to People Express. Frank Lorenzo's holding company, Texas Air Corporation, then acquired People Express, following Texas Air's acquisition of Texas International Airlines (TI). Texas Air Corporation later acquired Continental Airlines (CO) and then merged TI and CO under the Continental name. In 2010 Continental merged into United Airlines.

By 1986, Britt was operating code sharing flight services at the same time for two different major air carriers, Continental Airlines and Piedmont Airlines (1948-1989).  The airline was operating as Continental Express from Chicago O'Hare Airport (ORD) and as a Piedmont Commuter System air carrier from the Dayton International Airport (DAY) in Ohio where Piedmont was operating a hub at the time.

Britt Airways then began operating code sharing flights under the Continental Express banner for Continental from its major hubs located at Houston Intercontinental Airport (IAH, now George Bush Intercontinental Airport) in Houston, Texas and Newark International Airport (EWR, now Newark Liberty International Airport) in Newark, New Jersey. According to the Official Airline Guide (OAG), in 1989 Britt was the primary Continental Express carrier at Houston Intercontinental operating ATR-42 and Embraer EMB-120 Brasilia propjet aircraft on feeder services on behalf of Continental.  By 1991, the airline was the primary Continental Express carrier at Newark as well operating ATR-42 and Embraer EMB-120 Brasilia aircraft according to the OAG.

Britt Airways also operated out of Cleveland Hopkins Airport (CLE), beginning in November, 1987, flying Swearingen Metroliner (Metro II model) propjets. By 1989, Britt was operating all Continental Express flights from Cleveland with Embraer EMB-120 Brasilia propjets.  

In 1991, Britt Airways began operating Continental Express service formerly flown by Rocky Mountain Airways from Denver (DEN).  According to the October 1, 1991 Official Airline Guide (OAG), the airline was operating Continental Express flights from Denver with de Havilland Canada DHC-7 Dash 7 and Beechcraft 1900C turboprops formerly flown by Rocky Mountain Airways as well as with ATR-42 propjets.

Destinations in 1984

According to its May 29, 1984 route map, Britt Airways was serving the following destinations as an independent air carrier.  Destinations noted in bold were receiving British Aircraft Corporation BAC One-Eleven jet service operated by Britt in early 1985. 

 Bloomington, IL/Normal, IL
 Bloomington, IN
 Burlington, IA
 Cape Girardeau, MO
 Cedar Rapids, IA - (Iowa City, IA was served via Cedar Rapids)
 Chicago, IL - O'Hare Airport - Primary Hub
 Champaign, IL - (Urbana, IL was served via Champaign)
 Cincinnati, OH
 Danville, IL
 Decatur, IL
 Detroit, MI
 Evansville, IN
 Galesburg, IL
 Indianapolis, IN - Secondary Hub
 Lafayette, IN
 Mattoon, IL/Charleston, IL
 Memphis, TN
 Marion, IL/Herrin, IL
 Moline, IL - (Davenport, IA was served via Moline)
 Muncie, IN
 Paducah, KY
 Peoria, IL
 Quincy, IL
 St. Louis, MO - Secondary Hub
 South Bend, IN
 Springfield, IL
 Sterling, IL/Rock Falls, IL
 Terre Haute, IN - Headquarters for the airline

Fleet

Britt operated the following aircraft types at different times over the years.  Fleet information  is taken from the Britt historical website, www.brittairlines.com 

 ATR-42
 Beechcraft 99
 British Aircraft Corporation BAC One-Eleven series 400  (only jet aircraft type operated by the airline)
 Embraer EMB 120 Brasilia
 Fairchild F-27
 Fairchild Hiller FH-227
 Swearingen Metroliner - (Metro II models)

Britt also operated Beechcraft 1900C and de Havilland Canada Dash 7 aircraft formerly flown by Rocky Mountain  Airways following its commencement of Continental Express service in Denver.

Accidents and incidents

The airline's first fatal accident was on Jan. 30, 1984, when a repositioning flight from Terre Haute, Indiana to Evansville, Indiana crashed shortly after takeoff from Hulman Regional Airport in Terre Haute. Three Britt employees were killed. The National Transportation Safety Board could not determine the cause of the crash but found unauthorized wiring in the plane debris. The plane, N63Z, was destroyed. 

Continental Express Flight 2574

See also 
 List of defunct airlines of the United States

Bibliography
 Eastwood, Tony. Turboprop Airliner Production List. 1998. The Aviation Hobby Shop. .

References

Continental Airlines
Defunct regional airlines of the United States
Airlines established in 1964
1964 establishments in Indiana
Airlines disestablished in 1996
1996 disestablishments in Indiana
American companies established in 1964
Defunct airlines of the United States